Felipe Castaldo Curcio (born 8 June 1993) is a Brazilian professional footballer of Italian descent who plays as a midfielder for  club Padova. He also holds Italian citizenship.

Club career
He made his Serie C debut for Foggia on 21 September 2014 in a game against Benevento.

On 23 January 2020, he signed a contract with Salernitana until the end of 2019–20 season with an option to extend it for two more seasons. On 5 October 2020, he was loaned to Padova.

References

External links
 

1993 births
Living people
People from Jundiaí
Brazilian people of Italian descent
Footballers from São Paulo (state)
Brazilian footballers
Association football midfielders
Cianorte Futebol Clube players
Serie B players
Serie C players
Calcio Foggia 1920 players
Lupa Roma F.C. players
A.S. Martina Franca 1947 players
S.S. Fidelis Andria 1928 players
Brescia Calcio players
U.S. Salernitana 1919 players
Calcio Padova players
Brazilian expatriate footballers
Brazilian expatriate sportspeople in Italy
Expatriate footballers in Italy